= National Association of NGOs =

The National Association of NGOs (NANGO) is an umbrella organisation of over 1000 NGOs in Zimbabwe established in 1962. NANGO is committed to “strengthen, represent and coordinate the work of NGOs in Zimbabwe by creating space, promoting networking, dialogue and engagement to enable the fulfilment of members’ visions and missions”. NANGOs vision is “a proactive community of NGOs responsive and committed to the sustainable development needs of all people in Zimbabwe and the full realisation of human rights, democracy, good governance and poverty alleviation.”
